Stephanos or Stefanos, in Greek , is a masculine given name derived from the Greek word  (stéphanos), meaning "wreath, crown" and by extension "reward, honor, renown, fame", from the verb  (stéphein), "to encircle, to wreathe". In Ancient Greece, crowning wreaths (such as laurel wreaths) were given to the winners of contests. Originally, as the verb suggests, the noun had a more general meaning of any "circle"—including a circle of people, a circling wall around a city, and, in its earliest recorded use, the circle of a fight, which is found in the Iliad of Homer. The English equivalent is Stephen.

People or biblical figures with the given name include:
 Saint Stephen (Greek: Stéphanos) (c. 5 AD–c. 34 AD), considered the first Christian martyr
 Stephanos Byzantios, 6th century author of a geographical dictionary
 Stephanos of Alexandria (fl. c. 580–c. 640), Byzantine philosopher and teacher
 Stephanos of Tallinn (born 1940), primate of the Orthodox Church of Estonia since 1999
 Stephanos Bibas (born 1969), United States circuit judge and professor of law and criminology
 Stephanos Christopoulos (1876–after 1906), Greek wrestler and weightlifter
 Stefanos Dedas (born 1982), Greek professional basketball head coach
 Stefanos Dragoumis (1842–1923), Greek judge, writer and Prime Minister of Greece in 1910
 Stefanos Gennadis (1858-1922), Greek general
 Stefanos Kapino (born 1994), Greek football goalkeeper
 Stephanos Mousouros, Ottoman-appointed Prince of Samos from 1896 to 1899
 Stephanos Papadopoulos (born 1976), Greek-American poet
 Stephanos Sahlikis (1330–after 1391), Cretan satirical poet
 Stephanos Stephanides (born 1951), Cypriot-born author, poet, translator, critic, ethnographer and documentary filmmaker
 Stephanos Theodosius (1924–2007), Bishop of the Calcutta diocese of the Malankara Orthodox Church
 Stefanos Tsitsipas (born 1998), Greek tennis player

References

Greek masculine given names